Marija Mikhailovna Bakunina (also known as Marussia Bakunin) (2 February 1873, in Krasnoyarsk, Russia – 17 April 1960, in Naples), was a Russian-Italian chemist and biologist.

Education 
Maria, even as a young student, became "preparer" at the Federico II University chemical laboratory in Naples, where in 1895 she graduated in chemistry with a degree thesis on stereochemistry.

Career 
Following her graduation, Bakunina received the Academy prize for physics and mathematics in Naples in 1900. In 1909 she went to work teaching applied chemistry at the Scuola Superiore Politecnica in Naples, where in 1912 she became Chair in Applied Technological Chemistry.

Earth sciences 
In 1906 Bakunina was part of a group studying the eruption of Mount Vesuvius, and in 1909 she compiled a geological map of Italy.
As part of the map project, she studied the oil shale and ichthyolithic deposits of mountains in the Salerno area of Italy. Following this, from 1911 until 1930, Bakunin worked as a consultant for local governments and companies interested in industrial development of ichthyol mines in the Giffoni district (Monti Picentini).

Later career 
After the Second World War, Bakunina worked with Benedetto Croce to rebuild the Accademia Pontaniana, and in 1944 she was elected its president. In her capacity as president, Bakunina restored the Academy's library.

Family 
Maria Bakunina was the daughter of the well-known revolutionary philosopher Mikhail Bakunin and the aunt of the famous Neapolitan mathematician Renato Caccioppoli. The story is told that in 1938 Renato was imprisoned after he delivered a speech against Fascism but his aunt, Maria, was able to obtain his release by calling his mental abilities into question.

Notes

References 
 
 
 English translation abstract by Manuela Baglivo
 

1873 births
1960 deaths
20th-century biologists
20th-century chemists
20th-century women scientists
Italian chemists
Italian women chemists
Italian biologists
Italian women biologists
People from Krasnoyarsk
University of Naples Federico II alumni
Academic staff of the University of Naples Federico II
Emigrants from the Russian Empire to Italy